Well Red magazine was a bi-monthly 64-page magazine that "tackles matters on and off the pitch at Liverpool F.C.". It was launched in April 2010 and its final issue was December 2013.

Each issue of Well Red includes contributions from readers and leading football journalists and authors.

Contributors so far have included Dion Fanning (Irish Sunday Independent), Tony Barrett (The Times), Rory Smith (The Telegraph), Tony Evans (The Times), Dave Kirby (playwright, writer and poet), Paul Tomkins (author of eight Liverpool books), Jamie Casey (Sky Sports) and Tony Teasdale (Arena, Esquire).

The magazine has been referenced by mainstream media sources including The Mirror and BBC Sport.

References

2010 establishments in the United Kingdom
2013 disestablishments in the United Kingdom
Association football magazines
Bi-monthly magazines published in the United Kingdom
Sports magazines published in the United Kingdom
Defunct magazines published in the United Kingdom
English-language magazines
Liverpool F.C.
Magazines established in 2010
Magazines disestablished in 2013
Mass media in Liverpool